Qotbabad Rural District is a rural district (dehestan) in Kordian District, Jahrom County, Fars Province, Iran. At the 2006 census, its population was 1,569, in 369 families.  The rural district has 21 villages.

References 

Rural Districts of Fars Province
Jahrom County